John Parricelli (born 5 April 1959 in Evesham, Wychavon, Worcestershire, England) is a jazz guitarist who has worked mainly in the United Kingdom.

Parricelli began his career as a guitarist in 1982. He was one of the founding members of the British big band Loose Tubes, with whom he recorded three albums. He has worked with Annie Whitehead, Kenny Wheeler, Norma Winstone, Lee Konitz, Paul Motian, Chris Laurence, Peter Erskine, Vince Mendoza, Julian Argüelles, Iain Ballamy, Mark Lockheart, Andy Sheppard, Gerard Presencer, Colin Towns, and Stacey Kent.

In 2011, he appeared on stage with Peter Erskine and John Paul Jones at the Royal Opera House, London, in the opera Anna Nicole.

Discography
 Alba (Provocateur, 2004)
 Milk (soundtrack) (Decca, 2008)
 Postcards from Home (KEDA, 2012)
With Lars Danielsson
 Cloudland (ACT Music, 2021)
 Liberetto III (ACT Music, 2017)
 Liberetto II (ACT Music, 2014)
 Liberetto (ACT Music, 2012)
 Tarantella (ACT Music, 2009)
With Katie Melua
 Pictures (Dramatico, 2007)
 Secret Symphony (Dramatico, 2012)
 Ketevan (Dramatico, 2013)
With Andy Sheppard
 Learning to Wave (Provocateur, 1998)
 Dancing Man and Woman (Provocateur, 2000)
 P.S. (Provocateur, 2003)
 Movements in Colour (ECM, 2009)
With David Gilmour
 Rattle That Lock (Columbia Records, 2015)
With Ronan Keating
 Winter Songs (Polydor Records, 2009)
With Charlotte Church
 Enchantment (Columbia Records, 2001)
With Russell Watson
 Encore (Decca Records, 2001)
With Seal
 Standards (Decca Records, 2017)
With Leona Lewis
 Spirit (J, 2007)
With Robbie Williams
 Swings Both Ways (Island Records, 2013)
With Jamie Cullum
 Twentysomething (Verve, 2003)
With Colin Towns
 Still Life (Provocateur, 1998)
 Another Think Coming (Provocateur, 2001)
 The Orpheus Suite (Provocateur, 2004)
With Gary Barlow
 Since I Saw You Last (Polydor Records, 2013)
With Duffy
 Endlessly (Mercury, 2010)
With Emma Bunton
 Free Me (19, 2004)
With Toni Braxton
 Pulse (Atlantic Records, 2010)
With Kenny Wheeler
 A Long Time Ago (ECM, 1997)
 Dream Sequence (Psi, 1995-2003 [2003])
 It Takes Two! (CAM Jazz, 2006)
 Songs for Quintet (ECM, 2013 [2015])
With Judie Tzuke
 Wonderland (Essential Records, 1992)

References

20th-century British guitarists
21st-century British guitarists
English jazz guitarists
English male guitarists
Living people
1959 births
Place of birth missing (living people)
20th-century British male musicians
20th-century British musicians
21st-century British male musicians
British male jazz musicians
Loose Tubes members